Semisulcospira diminuta is a species of freshwater snail with an operculum, an aquatic gastropod mollusk in the family Semisulcospiridae.

Distribution 
This species occurs in Hunan Province, China.

References

External links

Semisulcospiridae